
This is a timeline of Maltese history, comprising important legal and territorial changes and political events in Malta and its predecessor states.  To read about the background to these events, see History of Malta.  See also the list of monarchs of Malta and list of Governors of Malta.

Timeline

 Millennia: 1st BC1st–2nd3rd

Centuries: 10th BC9th BC8th BC7th BC6th BC5th BC4th BC3rd BC2nd BC1st BC

10th century BC

9th century BC

8th century BC

7th century BC

6th century BC

5th century BC

4th century BC

3rd century BC

2nd century BC

1st century BC 

 Centuries: 1st2nd3rd4th5th6th7th8th9th10th11th12th13th14th15th16th17th18th19th20th

1st century

2nd century

3rd century

4th century

5th century

6th century

7th century

8th century

9th century

10th century

11th century

12th century

13th century

14th century

15th century

16th century

17th century

18th century

19th century

20th century

21st century

Further reading
Montalto, J. Nobles of Malta 1530-1800 (1979); Report of the Commission appointed to enquire into the claims of the Maltese Nobility (1878)
Doing Business with Malta. p. 3-14.

References

Maltese
Malta history-related lists